Bernie Jones (3 May 1953 – 20 June 2022) was a former Australian rules footballer who played for Hawthorn and Essendon in the VFL during the 1970s.

A ruckman, Jones played in two Grand Finals in his first stint with Hawthorn, the first in 1975 which they lost and the other the following season which they won. In 1978 he crossed to Essendon for the season before returning to Hawthorn where he played until his retirement in 1980.

Jones has a son, Dylan, who plays for the Sandringham Football Club.

References

1953 births
2022 deaths
Hawthorn Football Club players
Hawthorn Football Club Premiership players
Essendon Football Club players
De La Salle OC Amateur Football Club players
Australian rules footballers from Victoria (Australia)
One-time VFL/AFL Premiership players